Rome Township, Ohio may refer to:
Rome Township, Ashtabula County, Ohio
Rome Township, Athens County, Ohio
Rome Township, Lawrence County, Ohio

See also  
 Rome, Ohio (disambiguation)

Ohio township disambiguation pages